Vijayadashami, also known as Dussehra, Dasara or Dashain, is a major Hindu festival celebrated every year at the end of Navaratri. It is observed on the tenth day of the month of Ashvin, the seventh in the Hindu Luni-Solar Calendar. The festival which typically falls in the Gregorian calendar months of September and October.

Vijayadashami is observed for different reasons and celebrated differently in various parts of the Indian subcontinent. In the southern, eastern, northeastern, and some northern states of India, Vijayadashami marks the end of Durga Puja, remembering goddess Durga's victory against the buffalo demon Mahishasura to restore and protect dharma. In the northern, central and western states, the festival is also called Dussehra (also spelled Dasara, Dashahara). In these regions, it marks the end of Ramlila and commemorates god Rama's victory over the demon king Ravana. Alternatively, it marks a reverence for one of the aspects of goddess Devi, such as Durga or Saraswati.

Vijayadashami celebrations include processions to a river or ocean front that involve carrying clay statues of Durga, Lakshmi, Saraswati, Ganesha and Kartikeya, accompanied by music and chants, after which the images are immersed in the water for dissolution and farewell. In other places, towering effigies of Ravana, symbolising evil, are burnt with fireworks, marking evil's destruction. The festival also starts the preparations for Diwali, the important festival of lights, which is celebrated twenty days after Vijayadashami.

Etymology
The same Hindu festival-related term, however, takes different forms in different regions of India and Nepal, as well as among Hindu minorities found elsewhere.

The word dussehra is the British English spelling of the tadbhava Dasahrā.

Ramayana
The celebration of this festival is founded in the epic Ramayana. It is the day Rama defeats the demon king Ravana, after kidnapping Rama's wife, Sita. Ravana kidnaps Sita and takes her to his kingdom in Lanka (present day Sri Lanka).  Rama asks Ravana to release her, but Ravana refuses; the situation escalates and leads to war. Prior to this, Ravana performed severe penance for ten thousand years and received a boon from the creator-god Brahma that he could henceforth not be killed by gods, demons, or spirits. However, Rama (a human and incarnate of Lord Vishnu) defeats and kills him, thus circumventing the boon given by Lord Brahma. A battle takes place between Rama and Ravana in which Rama kills Ravana and ends his evil rule. Finally, Dharma was established on the Earth because of Rama's victory over Ravana. The festival commemorates the victory of Good over Evil.

Mahabharata 
In the Mahabharata, Vijayadashami also marks the day that the Pandava warrior Arjuna defeats the Kauravas. The epic tells the story of the  Pandava brothers who are known to have spent their thirteenth year of exile under concealed identity in Matsya, the kingdom of Virata. Before going to Virata, they are known to have hung their celestial weapons in a Shami tree for safekeeping for a year. It was during this time that Kauravas decided to attack the kingdom in which Arjuna retrieved the weapons from the Shami tree and defeated the entire Kaurava army.

Regional variations

Northern India

In most of northern and western India, Dasha-Hara (literally, "ten days") is celebrated in honour of Lord Rama. Thousands of drama-dance-music plays based on the Ramayana and Ramcharitmanas (Ramlila) are performed at outdoor fairs across the land and in temporarily built staging grounds featuring effigies of the demons Ravana, Kumbhakarna and Meghanada. The effigies are burnt on bonfires in the evening of Vijayadashami or Dussehra. While Dussehra is observed on the same day across India, the festivities leading to it vary. In many places, the "Rama Lila" or the brief version of the story of Rama, Sita and Lakshmana, is enacted over the 9 days leading up to the festival. In other cities, such as Varanasi, the entire story is freely acted out by performance-artists before the public every evening for a month.

The performance arts tradition during the Dussehra festival was inscribed by UNESCO (United Nations Educational, Scientific and Cultural Organization) as one of the "Intangible Cultural Heritage of Humanity" in 2008. The festivities, states UNESCO, include songs, narration, recital and dialogue based on the Hindu text Ramacharitmanas by Tulsidas. It is celebrated across northern India for Dussehra, but particularly in historically important Hindu cities of Ayodhya, Varanasi, Vrindavan, Almora, Satna and Madhubani. The festival and dramatic enactment of the virtues versus vices filled story is organised by communities in hundreds of small villages and towns, attracting a mix of audiences from different social, gender and economic backgrounds. In many parts of India, the audience and villagers join in and participate spontaneously, helping the artists, others helping with stage setup, make-up, effigies, and lights. These arts come to a close on the night of Dussehra, when the victory of Rama is celebrated by burning the effigies of evil Ravan and his colleagues.

Himachal Pradesh

Kullu Dussehra is celebrated in the Kullu valley of Himachal Pradesh and is regionally notable for its large fair and parade witnessed by an estimated half a million people. The festival is a symbol of victory of good over evil by Raghu Nath, and is celebrated like elsewhere in the Indian subcontinent with a procession. The special feature of the Kullu Dussehra procession is the arrival of floats containing deities from different parts of the nearby regions and their journey to Kullu.

South India
 

Vijayadashami is celebrated in a variety of ways in South India. Celebrations range from worshipping Durga, lighting up temples and major forts such as at Mysore, to displaying colourful figurines, known as a golu.

The festival played a historical role in the 14th-century Vijayanagara Empire, where it was called Mahanavami. The Italian traveller Niccolò de' Conti described the festival's intensity and importance as a grandeur religious and martial event with royal support. The event revered Durga as the warrior goddess (some texts refer to her as Chamundeshwari). The celebrations hosted athletic competitions, singing and dancing, fireworks, a pageantry military parade and charitable giving to the public.

The city of Mysore has traditionally been a major center of Dasara-Vijayadashami celebrations.

This festival is called Dasara in Karnataka and the 10 day festival is celebrated as Shara navaratri where the Goddess in every temple is worshiped for 10 days in 10 forms with different Alankar/forms to signify different Goddesses avatar. Many cultural programs and competitions are organized in many cities like Mysuru, Shivamoga, Bengaluru etc. On the evening of the last day of the ten-festival, the temple's Goddesses are taken in a procession to mark victory over evil and the completion of the war. People of Karnataka exchange leaves of Shami tree as symbol of gold on 10th day evening marking the win over demon.
Another Navaratri tradition in Karnataka has been decorating a part of one's home with art dolls called Gombe or Bombe, similar to Golu dolls of Tamil Nadu. An art-themed Gaarudi Gombe, featuring folk dances that incorporate these dolls, is also a part of the celebration.

Another significant and notable tradition of several South Indian regions has been the dedication of this festival to Saraswati, the Hindu goddess of knowledge, learning, music and arts. She is worshipped along with instruments of one's trade during this festival. In South India, people maintain, clean and worship their instruments, tools of work and implements of their livelihood during this festival, remembering Goddess Saraswati and Durga.

Children aged 3–4 who are new to school are admitted to school on Vijayadashami Day.

Western India
 

In Gujarat, people engage the popular festival, Navaratri, a nine-day festival that takes places before Vijayadashami. Both the goddess Durga and Lord Rama are revered for their victory over evil. Fasting and prayers at temples are common. A regional dance called Dandiya Raas, that deploys colourfully decorated sticks, and garba, (another type of regional dance) is a part of the festivities through the night.

The Gondi people instead celebrate Ravan by carrying an image of him riding an elephant and singing praises to him, as they consider Ravan as their ancestor and one of their gods.
In Goa, this festival is locally known as Dasro in Konkani, marks Goddess Durga's victory over the demon Mahishasura, concludes the festivities. Insignia known as Taranga play an important role in the festivities, which are sacred umbrellas that symbolize the village deities. At many temples, a dance of the Tarangas is held. Oracles are associated with Dasara in Goa. On this day, a ritual called Seemollanghan of the deities is held. For this people make a symbolic crossing of the border of their village. The icons of deities are carried in a grand procession. The tradition traces its roots to ancient times when kings would cross the border of their kingdom to wage war with the neighbouring kingdom. After Seemollanghan, there is a tradition wherein people exchange Aaptyachi pana. These leave symbolise gold and the ritual is a symbolic representation of the exchange of gold.

The festival is also celebrated as a harvest festival by farmers and has an important association with Agricultural activities. At Dussehra, Kharif crops like Rice, Guar, Cotton, Soybean, Maize, finger millet, pulses are generally ready for harvest, farmers begin their harvest on the day. Farmers bring crops like Kharif crops from their fields for further processing and for trade. Due to this, daily arrivals of these crops in markets of the country normally increases significantly during this period.

The festival has been historically important in Maharashtra. Maratha forces in 17th and 18th centuries  including those of Shivaji and the Peshwas  would start their new military campaigns on Dasara. In North Maharashtra this festival is known as Dasara, and on this day people wear new clothes, and touch feet of elderly people and deities of the village temple. The deities installed on the first day of Navaratri are immersed in water. Observers visit each other and exchange sweets. Many communities in Maharashtra including the tribal communities of warli and Kokna exchange leaves of Apta tree as symbol of gold.

In Mewar region of Rajasthan, both Durga and Rama have been celebrated on Vijayadashami, and it has been a major festival for Rajput warriors.

Eastern India

In West Bengal Vijayadashami is observed as Bijoya Dashomi, immediately after the day of Dashomi (the tenth day of Navaratri). It is marked by processions in which clay statues are taken to a river or ocean for a solemn goodbye to Durga. Many mark their faces with vermilion (sindoor) or wear red clothing. It is an emotional day for some devotees, especially the Bengalis, and even for many atheists as the congregation sings goodbye songs. When the procession reaches the water, the clay statues of Durga and her four children are immersed; the clay dissolves and they are believed to return to Mount Kailasha with Shiva, and to the cosmos in general. People distribute sweets and gifts, and visit friends and family members. Some communities such as those near Varanasi mark the eleventh day, called ekadashi, by visiting a Durga temple.

Nepal

In Nepal, Vijayadashami follows the festival of Dashain. Youngsters visit the elders in their family, distant ones come to their native homes, students visit their school teachers and government workers visit head of the state (previously king now president). The elders and teachers welcome the youngsters and bless them for virtuous success and prosperity in the year ahead. Elders give "Dakshina", or a small amount of money, to younger relatives at this time along with the blessings. It is celebrated for 15 days from Shukla Paksha to Poornima. The red tika or simply tika symbolizes the blessings of goddess durga. Red also symbolizes the blood that ties the family together.

See also

 Ayudha Puja
 Bathukamma
 Dasara elephants
 Durga Puja
 Golu
 Kullu Dussehra
 Madikeri Dasara
 Navaratri
 Prasad
 Puja (Hinduism)
 Vidyāraṃbhaṃ
 Zatra

Notes

References

Bibliography

External links

Mysuru (Karnataka) Dasara Festival at mysoredasara.gov.in
Dussehra in Telangana at telanganatourism.gov.in

Hindu festivals
Hindu holy days
Hindu festivals in India
September observances
October observances
Religious festivals in Bangladesh
Religious festivals in India
Hindu festivals in Nepal
Religious festivals in Pakistan
Religious festivals in Sri Lanka
Traditions involving fire